Steeger is a surname. Notable people with the surname include:

Harry Steeger (1903–1990), co-founder of Popular Publications, one of the major publishers of pulp magazine 
Ingrid Steeger (born 1947), German actress and comedian

See also
Steger (disambiguation)